Alakola-ela is a village in Sri Lanka. It is located within Matale District, Central Province.

History
The village contains the ruins of a stupa (dagoba) and carved pillars. As of the writing of Archibald Campbell Lawrie's 1896 gazetteer of the province, the inhabitants of the village were winnowers.

Demographics

See also
List of towns in Central Province, Sri Lanka

References

External links

Populated places in Matale District